White Horse (also, Whitehorse and Kinyon) is an unincorporated community in Modoc County, California.

The White Horse post office opened in 1930, changed its name to Kinyon in 1952, and closed in 1964.

References

Further reading 

 

Unincorporated communities in California
Unincorporated communities in Modoc County, California